Noda may refer to:

Places
Noda, Azerbaijan, a village in Azerbaijan
Noda, Chiba, a city in Chiba Prefecture, Japan
Noda, Iwate, a village in Iwate Prefecture, Japan
Noda, Kagoshima, a former town in Kagoshima Prefecture, Japan
NoDa (neighborhood), Charlotte, North Carolina, United States
Nöda, a municipality in Thuringia, Germany
 Name of Chekhov, Sakhalin Oblast until 1947

Other uses
Noda (surname), a Japanese surname
National Operatic and Dramatic Association